Kristina O'Hara (born 8 April 1996) is a boxer from Belfast.

Early life
O'Hara attended St Louise's Comprehensive College in Belfast.

Career

O'Hara first attended Emerald Boxing Club in Lenadoon.

O'Hara boxes with St John Bosco BC in west Belfast.

She won gold at the European Union Junior Championships in Hungary in 2013 and followed it with silver at the European Youths in Italy a year later.

A light flyweight, she won silver at the 2018 Commonwealth Games.

References

External links

Living people
1996 births
Women boxers from Northern Ireland
Boxers at the 2018 Commonwealth Games
Commonwealth Games medallists in boxing
Commonwealth Games silver medallists for Northern Ireland
Boxers from Belfast
Light-flyweight boxers
Medallists at the 2018 Commonwealth Games